The Indian locomotive class WDP-3A, colloquially nicknamed the Toaster, is a class of diesel-electric locomotive that was developed in 1998 by Banaras Locomotive Works, Varanasi for Indian Railways. The model name stands for broad gauge (W), Diesel (D), Passengers traffic (P) locomotive with 3100 horsepower (3A). The WDP-3A is a later classification of earlier WDP-2. They entered service in 1998. A total of 44 were built between 1998 and 2001.

They are the Fastest ALCo based locomotive found in India with a Top speed of 160 km/h, on par with the premier Electric Locomotives. The WDP-3A served IR for over 24 years. A significant number of these locomotives are still in use, both on mainline and departmental duties. As of June 2022, few of the locomotives still retain "operational status" on the mainline as WDP-3A, with further examples having been Scrapped.

History 

The first one was delivered in October 1998, under the name of WDP-2. 44 units produced until February 2001 (Indian Railway road number 15501-15544) had dual cab forward design different from other classes of locos built by DLW (WDM3A, WDG3A and WDP1). These new locomotives have control stand similar to many electric locomotives. They are the re-geared versions of the WDM-3A. This was IR's attempt to build a high speed loco on ALCO platform. But the EMD locos came with a much better performance with higher HP rating to kill the prospect of WDP3As. These units have air brakes only and the gear ratio is 64:19.

These locos (WDP-2s then) were introduced initially the Chennai Egmore - Kanyakumari Section, hauling many Prestigious trains like the Pallavan Express, Vaigai Express, Rockfort Express, Nellai Express and Pothigai Express to name a few. A problem with the WDP-3A was that it would get uncomfortably hot inside the driving cabin on the radiator side and the locos were nicknamed “toasters” by the locomotive pilots. The WDP3A was best known for hauling the Trivandrum Rajdhani and later on the Mumbai CSMT - Karmali Tejas Express through the Konkan Railway at a top speed of 120 kmh single-handedly. In 2018, a couple of GOC Based WDP3A locomotives were rebuilt at DMW Patiala with better bogies for Riding comfort. Such Rebuilt toasters bear the suffix 'R' to their road numbers.

However, due to age issues and cracking of bogie underframes, the WDP3A locomotives of DLS GOC and KYN were withdrawn gradually from hauling passenger trains and were relegated to hauling departmental rakes. In 2021, GOC announced the Withdrawal of all WDP3A's in their shed and a few WDP3A's were sent to Ponmalai Workshop for scrapping. 15501 is To be preserved.

All WDP-3A locomotives of KYN DLS were condemned in January 2022 and scrapped at DLS.

Locomotive sheds

Former sheds 
 Kalyan

Gallery

See also 

 Indian locomotive class WDM-3A
 Indian locomotive class WDM-2
 List of diesel locomotives of India
 Rail transport in India
 Indian Railways

References 

P-3A
Banaras Locomotive Works locomotives
Co-Co locomotives
5 ft 6 in gauge locomotives
Railway locomotives introduced in 1994